Dracocephalum is a genus of about 60 to 70 species of flowering plants in the family Lamiaceae, native to temperate regions of the Northern Hemisphere. These flowers, collectively called dragonhead,  are annual or perennial herbaceous plants or subshrubs, growing to 15 to 90 centimeters tall.

Selected species

 Dracocephalum aitchisonii Rech.f.
 Dracocephalum argunense Fisch. ex Link
 Dracocephalum aucheri Boiss.
 Dracocephalum austriacum L.
 Dracocephalum bipinnatum Rupr.
 Dracocephalum botryoides Steven
 Dracocephalum breviflorum Turrill
 Dracocephalum bullatum Forrest ex Diels
 Dracocephalum butkovii Krassovsk.
 Dracocephalum calophyllum Hand.-Mazz.
 Dracocephalum charkeviczii Prob.
 Dracocephalum discolor Bunge
 Dracocephalum diversifolium Rupr.
 Dracocephalum ferganicum Lazkov
 Dracocephalum foetidum Bunge
 Dracocephalum formosum Gontsch.
 Dracocephalum forrestii W.W.Sm.
 Dracocephalum fragile Turcz. ex Benth.
 Dracocephalum fruticulosum Steph. ex Willd.
 Dracocephalum grandiflorum L.
 Dracocephalum heterophyllum Benth.
 Dracocephalum hoboksarensis G.J.Liu
 Dracocephalum imberbe Bunge
 Dracocephalum imbricatum C.Y.Wu & W.T.Wang
 Dracocephalum integrifolium Bunge
 Dracocephalum isabellae Forrest ex W.W.Sm.
 Dracocephalum jacutense Peschkova
 Dracocephalum junatovii A.L.Budantsev
 Dracocephalum kafiristanicum Bornm.
 Dracocephalum komarovii Lipsky
 Dracocephalum kotschyi Boiss.
 Dracocephalum krylovii Lipsky
 Dracocephalum lindbergii Rech.f.
 Dracocephalum longipedicellatum Muschl.
 Dracocephalum microflorum C.Y.Wu & W.T.Wang
 Dracocephalum moldavica L. (type)
 Dracocephalum multicaule Montbret & Aucher ex Benth.
 Dracocephalum multicolor Kom.
 Dracocephalum nodulosum Rupr.
 Dracocephalum nuratavicum Adylov
 Dracocephalum nuristanicum Rech.f. & Edelb.
 Dracocephalum nutans L.
 Dracocephalum oblongifolium Regel
 Dracocephalum olchonense Peschkova
 Dracocephalum origanoides Steph. ex Willd.
 Dracocephalum palmatoides C.Y.Wu & W.T.Wang
 Dracocephalum palmatum Steph. ex Willd.
 Dracocephalum parviflorum Nutt.
 Dracocephalum paulsenii Briq.
 Dracocephalum peregrinum L.
 Dracocephalum pinnatum L.
 Dracocephalum polychaetum Bornm.
 Dracocephalum popovii T.V.Egorova & Sipliv.
 Dracocephalum propinquum W.W.Sm.
 Dracocephalum psammophilum C.Y.Wu & W.T.Wang
 Dracocephalum purdomii W.W.Sm.
 Dracocephalum renati Emb.
 Dracocephalum rigidulum Hand.-Mazz.
 Dracocephalum rupestre Hance
 Dracocephalum ruyschiana L.
 Dracocephalum schischkinii Strizhova
 Dracocephalum scrobiculatum Regel
 Dracocephalum spinulosum Popov
 Dracocephalum stamineum Kar. & Kir.
 Dracocephalum stellerianum Hiltebr.
 Dracocephalum subcapitatum (Kuntze) Lipsky
 Dracocephalum surmandinum Rech.f.
 Dracocephalum taliense Forrest ex W.W.Sm.
 Dracocephalum tanguticum Maxim.
 Dracocephalum thymiflorum L.
 Dracocephalum truncatum Y.Z.Sun ex C.Y.Wu
 Dracocephalum velutinum C.Y.Wu & W.T.Wang
 Dracocephalum wallichii Sealy
 Dracocephalum wendelboi Hedge

References

External links
 

 
Lamiaceae genera
Taxa named by Carl Linnaeus